The Progressive Party is a political party active in Sardinia, led by Massimo Zedda.

History
The party was founded on 3 March 2017 as the Sardinian branch of Progressive Camp, a political party led nationally by Giuliano Pisapia. The main founders of the Sardinian Progressive Camp were Roberto Capelli and Luciano Uras. 

When at the end of 2017 Pisapia's political party disbanded, the Sardinian section of Progressive Camp maintained its autonomy and continued to exist.

On the occasion of the regional elections in Sardinia in 2019, the centre-left coalition nominated Massimo Zedda, a member of Progressive Camp, as a candidate for the presidency of the region. Eventually, Zedda lost to centre-right challenger Christian Solinas, while Progressive Camp got 3.2% of the vote and two seats.

On 22 November 2019, Luciano Uras and Giuseppe Verona resigned as party president and treasurer respectively. The party subsequently changed its name to Sardinian Progressives and its leadership was taken over by Massimo Zedda.

In December 2021 the adhesion campaign to the constituent phase of the Progressive Party was launched, and a meeting of the regional promoting committee, convened and coordinated by Massimo Zedda, took place.

Electoral results

Sardinian regional elections

References

Political parties in Sardinia
Political parties established in 2017
2017 establishments in Italy